Kim Min-ah (Korean: 김민아) is a South Korean actress and model. She is best known for her roles in dramas such as Miss Independent Ji-eun 2, Ending Again and The World of My 17.

Filmography

Television series

References

External links 
 
 

1998 births
Living people
21st-century South Korean actresses
South Korean female models
South Korean television actresses